Bovine herpesvirus is a group of viruses from the family Herpesviridae that affect cattle.
 Bovine alphaherpesvirus 1 of subfamily Alphaherpesvirinae and genus Varicellovirus
 Bovine alphaherpesvirus 2 of subfamily Alphaherpesvirinae and genus Simplexvirus
 Bovine herpesvirus 3
 Bovine gammaherpesvirus 4 of subfamily Gammaherpesvirinae and genus Rhadinovirus
 Bovine alphaherpesvirus 5 of subfamily Alphaherpesvirinae and genus Varicellovirus
 Bovine gammaherpesvirus 6 of subfamily Gammaherpesvirinae and genus Macavirus